Dendromecon harfordii, known by the common names Channel Islands tree poppy and Harford's tree poppy, is a species of flowering plant in the poppy family.

It was formerly treated as subspecies of the related species Dendromecon rigida, and had the botanical name Dendromecon rigida subsp. harfordii.

Distribution
The plant is endemic to San Clemente Island, Santa Catalina Island, Santa Cruz Island, and Santa Rosa Island  in the Channel Islands of California.

It is found in California coastal sage and chaparral habitats on the islands.

Description
It has thin branching stems covered sparsely in smooth-edged, oval-shaped leaves 3 to 8 centimeters long.

It bears showy flowers with four bright yellow petals each 2 or 3 centimeters long.

The fruit is a curved, cylindrical capsule over 7 centimeters in length.

Cultivation
Dendromecon harfordii is cultivated as an ornamental plant, for planting in native plant, drought tolerant, and wildlife gardens, and in natural landscaping projects.

External links
Jepson Manual Treatment: Dendromecon harfordii
Dendromecon harfordii - U.C. Photo Gallery

Papaveroideae
Endemic flora of California
Natural history of the California chaparral and woodlands
Natural history of the Channel Islands of California
Garden plants of North America
Drought-tolerant plants
Flora without expected TNC conservation status